Dukovce is a village and municipality in Svidník District in the Prešov Region of north-eastern Slovakia.

History
The village was first mentioned in historical records in 1401.

Geography
The municipality lies at an altitude of 260 metres and covers an area of 5.636 km². It has a population of about 247 people.

Genealogical resources

The records for genealogical research are available at the state archive "Statny Archiv in Presov, Slovakia"

 Roman Catholic church records (births/marriages/deaths): 1848-1908 (parish B)
 Greek Catholic church records (births/marriages/deaths): 1862-1933 (parish B)
 Lutheran church records (births/marriages/deaths): 1742-1897 (parish B)

See also
 List of municipalities and towns in Slovakia

External links
 
 
https://web.archive.org/web/20071217080336/http://www.statistics.sk/mosmis/eng/run.html
Surnames of living people in Dukovce

Villages and municipalities in Svidník District
Šariš